"Harlem Shuffle" is an R&B song written and originally recorded by the duo Bob & Earl in 1963. 
In 1986, it was covered by the British rock band The Rolling Stones on their album Dirty Work.

Bob & Earl
It was released on Marc Records, a subsidiary of Titan Records. Barry White stated in a 1995 interview with the Boston Herald that, despite some claims to the contrary, he had no involvement with "Harlem Shuffle", though Page and White later worked extensively together.

In 2003, the original Bob & Earl version of the song was ranked  by the music critics of The Daily Telegraph on their list of the "50 Best Duets Ever". The song was used in the 1989 comedy-drama film Shag and the 2017 Edgar Wright-directed film Baby Driver.

Charts

The Rolling Stones version

The Rolling Stones' cover version, with Bobby Womack on backing vocals, appeared on their 1986 album Dirty Work. It went to number 5 on the US Billboard Hot 100 chart, number 13 in the United Kingdom, and number 1 in New Zealand. Keith Richards had been looking for songs to possibly include on the album and had been working up songs with Ronnie Wood and Womack while waiting for Jagger to return to the studio in Paris after doing promo work on his solo album. To Richards' surprise, Jagger liked the feel and cut the vocals quickly. It became the first cover song the Stones had released as an opening single off a new studio album since 1965. It opens with:
 

In 1986, a 12" extended single mix of the song was released. One side contained the "London Mix" and ran 6:19. The other side had a "New York Mix" and ran 6:35. Both mixes were variations of the 7" mix. The "New York Mix" is available on the CD, Rarities 1971–2003, although it has been edited to 5:48. Both full-length 12" versions can be found on Disc 25 of Singles 1971–2006.

Music video
The Rolling Stones produced an accompanying four-minute music video, which combined with live-action and animation. The live-action was directed by animation director Ralph Bakshi and the animation was directed by future The Ren & Stimpy Show creator John Kricfalusi. Other animators who worked on the video included Lynne Naylor, Jim Smith, Bob Jaques, Vicky Jenson, Pat Ventura and two other unknown animators.

Personnel
The Rolling Stones
Mick Jagger – lead and backing vocals, harmonica
Keith Richards – electric and acoustic guitars, piano, backing vocals
Ronnie Wood – electric, acoustic and pedal steel guitar, tenor saxophone, backing vocals
Bill Wyman – bass guitar, synthesizer
Charlie Watts – drums

Additional personnel
Chuck Leavell – keyboards
Ivan Neville – backing vocals, bass guitar, organ, synthesizer
Philippe Saisse – keyboards
Anton Fig – shakers
Dan Collette – trumpet
Ian Stewart – piano
Marku Ribas – percussion
Jimmy Cliff, Don Covay, Beverly D'Angelo, Kirsty MacColl, Dolette McDonald, Janice Pendarvis, Patti Scialfa and Tom Waits – backing vocals

Charts

Weekly charts

1Remix

Year-end charts

Certifications

Other versions
A version by The Traits from the fall of 1966 reached number 94 on the US Billboard Hot 100 and number 91 on Cash Box. The Action recorded the song in 1968 and released it as a single in Germany.

Samples
The song's opening horn section was sampled by the hip-hop group House of Pain for their breakthrough hit single "Jump Around" in 1992.

References

1963 songs
1963 singles
1986 short films
1986 singles
Animated music videos
Dance-rock songs
Hansa Records singles
Music videos directed by John Kricfalusi
Novelty and fad dances
Number-one singles in New Zealand
The Rolling Stones songs
Song recordings produced by Jagger–Richards
Song recordings produced by Steve Lillywhite
Songs about dancing
Songs about New York City